Zinter is a surname. Notable people with the surname include:

Alan Zinter (born 1968), American baseball player and coach
Steven L. Zinter (1950–2018), American judge

See also
Minter (surname)
Winter (surname)
Zinser